Hidden Files is the second solo studio album by American recording artist Havoc, a half of the hip hop duo Mobb Deep. It was released on February 24, 2009, on Koch Records. The singles "Watch Me" and "Heart of the Grind" have been released.

Mobb Deep performs together on the song "On a Mission".

Track listing
All tracks produced by Havoc

References

Havoc (musician) albums
2009 albums
Albums produced by Havoc (musician)